The 2014 Georgia State sand volleyball team represented Georgia State University during the college sand volleyball season of 2014. The team's head coach was Beth Van Fleet in her first season at GSU. They played their home games at the GSU Sand Volleyball Complex and competed as Division I independents under the AVCA.

Season Notes
The Panthers were ranked between 8th and 10th in the country during the end of the season.

2014 Roster

Schedule

|- bgcolor="#ccffcc"
| March 8 || FAU || - || - || St. Augustine, FL || 8:30 AM || W 5-0 || 1-0
|- bgcolor="#ccffcc"
| March 8 || Jacksonville || - || - || St. Augustine, FL || 12:30 PM || W 3-2 || 2-0
|- align="center" bgcolor="#ffccc"
| March 9 || FIU || - || 9 || St. Augustine, FL || 8:30 AM || L 2-3 || 2-1
|- bgcolor="#ccffcc"
| March 9 || ULM || - || - || St. Augustine, FL || 11:30 AM || W 3-2 || 3-1
|- bgcolor="#ccffcc"
| March 11 || FIU || - || 9 || GSU Sand Volleyball Complex || 11:00 AM || W 3-2 || 4-1
|- bgcolor="#ccffcc"
| March 11 || South Carolina || - || - || GSU Sand Volleyball Complex || 5:00 PM || W 5-0 || 5-1
|- bgcolor="#ccffcc"
| March 11 || Mercer || - || - || GSU Sand Volleyball Complex || 8:00 PM || W 5-0 || 6-1
|- bgcolor="#ccffcc"
| March 15 || Jacksonville || - || - || Cocoa Beach, FL || 8:00 AM || W 3-2 || 7-1
|- bgcolor="#ccffcc"
| March 15 || North Florida || - || - || Cocoa Beach, FL || 11:00 AM || W 3-2 || 8-1
|- align="center" bgcolor="#ffccc"
| March 16 || Stetson || - || - || Cocoa Beach, FL || 8:00 AM || L 2-3 || 8-2
|- align="center" bgcolor="#ffccc"
| March 29 || Pepperdine || 9 || 1 || GSU Sand Volleyball Complex || 11:00 AM || L 4-1 || 8-3
|- bgcolor="#ccffcc"
| March 29 || College of Charleston || 9 || - || GSU Sand Volleyball Complex || 11:00 AM || W 5-0 || 9-3
|- bgcolor="#ccffcc"
| April 5 || Mercer || 8 || - || Charleston, SC || 2:00 PM|| W 4-1 || 10-3
|- bgcolor="#ccffcc"
| April 5 || College of Charleston || 8 || - || Charleston, SC || 4:00 PM || W 4-1 || 11-3
|- align="center" bgcolor="#ffccc"
| April 6 || Florida State || 8 || 4 || Charleston, SC || 8:00 AM || L 3-2 || 11-4
|- bgcolor="#ccffcc"
| April 6 || South Carolina || 8 || - || Charleston, SC || 12:00 PM || W 4-1 || 12-4
|- bgcolor="#ccffcc"
| April 11 || Stetson || 9 || - || Siesta Key, FL || 5:00 PM || W 3-2 || 13-4
|- align="center" bgcolor="#ffccc"
| April 26 || UAB || 10 || - || Birmingham, AL || 11:00 AM || L 2-3 || 13-5
|- bgcolor="#ccffcc"
| April 26 || Tulane || 10 || - || Birmingham, AL || 1:00 PM || W 5-0 || -14-5
|-

References

External links

 Georgia State University Official website
 Georgia State Panthers Official Athletics website

Georgia State Panthers